The 1947–48 Yorkshire Cup was the fortieth occasion on which the  Yorkshire Cup competition had been held.

Wakefield Trinity won the trophy by beating Leeds by the score of 8–7 in a replay, the  first match having ended in a 7–7 draw.

The final was played at Fartown, Huddersfield, now in West Yorkshire. The attendance was 24,334 and receipts were £3,463

The  replay took place in mid-week, four days later at Odsal in the City of Bradford, now in West Yorkshire. The attendance was a marvellous 32,000 and receipts were £3,255

This was Wakefield Trinity's second Yorkshire cup final triumph in successive years, and their third final appearance in three years

Background 

This season, junior/amateur clubs Yorkshire Amateurs were again invited to take part and the  number of clubs who entered remained at the same as last season's total number of sixteen.

This in turn resulted in no byes in the first round.

The  competition again followed the  original formula of a knock-out tournament, with the  exception of the  first round which was still played on a two-legged home and away basis.

Competition and results

Round 1 – first leg 
Involved  8 matches (with no byes) and 16 clubs

All first round ties are played on a two-legged home and away basis

Round 1 – second leg  
Involved  8 matches (with no byes) and 16 clubs

All first round ties are played on a two-legged home and away basis

Round 2 – quarterfinals 
Involved 4 matches and 8 clubs

All second round ties are played on a knock-out basis

Round 3 – semifinals  
Involved 2 matches and 4 clubs

Both semi-final ties are played on a knock-out basis

Final

Final - Replay

Teams and scorers 

Scoring – Try = three (3) points – Goal = two (2) points – Drop goal = two (2) points

The road to success 
All the ties in the  first round were played on a two leg (home and away) basis.

For the  first round ties, the first club named in each of the ties played the first leg at home.

For the  first round ties, the scores shown are the aggregate score over the two legs.

Notes and comments 
 Yorkshire Amateurs were a team from Yorkshire which appeared to have players selected from  many both professional and amateur clubs  Yorkshire Amateurs played on many grounds, this match was played at Parkside, the ground of Hunslet
 The attendance is given as 24,344 by the  Rothmans Rugby League Yearbook of 1991–92 and 1990–91  but 24,334 by RUGBYLEAGUEproject  and also by "100 Years of Rugby. The History of Wakefield Trinity 1873–1973"
 The receipts were stated as £3,461 in the  Rothmans Rugby League Yearbook of 1991–92 and 1990–91  but £2 more in "100 Years of Rugby.
 Fartown was the home ground of Huddersfield from 1878 to the end of the 1991–92 season to Huddersfield Town FC's Leeds Road stadium, and then to the McAlpine Stadium in 1994. Fartown remained as a sports/Rugby League ground but is now rather dilapidated, and is only used for staging amateur rugby league games. Due to lack of maintenance, terrace closures and finally major storm damage closing one of the stands in 1986, the final ground capacity had been reduced to just a few thousands although the record attendance was set in a Challenge cup semi-final on 19 April 1947 when a crowd of 35,136 saw Leeds beat Wakefield Trinity 21–0
 The receipts were stated as £3,251 in the Rothmans Rugby League Yearbook of 1991–92 and 1990–91  but £4 more in "100 Years of Rugby. The History of Wakefield Trinity 1873–1973".
 Odsal is the home ground of Bradford Northern from 1890 to 2010 and the current capacity is in the region of 26,000, The ground is famous for hosting the largest attendance at an English sports ground when 102,569 (it was reported that over 120,000 actually attended as several areas of boundary fencing collapse under the sheer weight of numbers) attended the replay of the Challenge Cup final on 5 May 1954 to see Halifax v Warrington

General information for those unfamiliar 
The Rugby League Yorkshire Cup competition was a knock-out competition between (mainly professional) rugby league clubs from  the  county of Yorkshire. The actual area was at times increased to encompass other teams from  outside the  county such as Newcastle, Mansfield, Coventry, and even London (in the form of Acton & Willesden.

The Rugby League season always (until the onset of "Summer Rugby" in 1996) ran from around August-time through to around May-time and this competition always took place early in the season, in the Autumn, with the final taking place in (or just before) December (The only exception to this was when disruption of the fixture list was caused during, and immediately after, the two World Wars)

See also 
1947–48 Northern Rugby Football League season
Rugby league county cups

References

External links
Saints Heritage Society
1896–97 Northern Rugby Football Union season at wigan.rlfans.com
Hull&Proud Fixtures & Results 1896/1897
Widnes Vikings – One team, one passion Season In Review – 1896–97
The Northern Union at warringtonwolves.org

1947 in rugby league
1947 in English sport
RFL Yorkshire Cup